Michael Levine may refer to:

 Michael Levine (DEA) (born 1939), former senior United States law enforcement agent
 Michael E. Levine (born 1941), New York University law professor
 Mike Levine (musician) (born 1949), bassist of Triumph
 Mike Levine (newspaper writer) (1952–2007), columnist and editor
Mike Levine (sports executive), sports agent and business executive, head of CAA Sports
 Michael Levine (biologist) (born c. 1952), Princeton scientist and co-discoverer of the Homeobox
 Michael Levine (set designer) (born 1961), Canadian set designer
 Michael A. Levine (born 1964), American composer
 Michael H. Levine, founding executive director of the Joan Ganz Cooney Center at Sesame Workshop
 Michael Levine (publicist), writer and publicist and founder of Levine Communication Office, Inc.

See also
 Mike Levin, California Democratic politician
 Michael Levin (born 1943), philosophy professor
 Michael Levin (soldier) (1984–2006), Israeli soldier
 Michael Graubart Levin